Dichomeris amphicoma is a moth in the family Gelechiidae. It was described by Edward Meyrick in 1912. It is found in São Paulo, Brazil.

The forewings are light ochreous-brownish, strewn with dark fuscous strigulae and with a blackish streak suffused with darker brown running from the base of the dorsum to the costa just above the apex. The costal area above this is paler ochreous. The hindwings are grey.

References

Moths described in 1912
amphicoma